Iris (from Greek  , the messenger of the gods among themselves and the personification of , the "rainbow") is a feminine name. It came into use in English-speaking countries in the 1500s in reference to the goddess and the coloring of the iris of the eye. It is also in use in Germany. It is also used in reference to the flowering plant.  Its diminutive or pet form is Irie. 

It was the 77th most popular name given to baby girls in England and Wales in 2020 and was the 127th most popular name given to baby girls born in the United States in 2020. It has also ranked among the top 100 names given to baby girls in Belgium, Catalonia, France, Iceland, Italy, Netherlands, Norway, Slovenia, Spain and Sweden during the past decade.

Iris may refer to:

People
Iris Adrian (1912–1994), American actress
Iris Apfel (born 1921), American fashion icon
Iris von Arnim (born 1945), German fashion designer
Iris Ashley (1909–1994), Irish-born British stage and film actress
Iris Apatow (born 2002), American actress
Iris Bahr or Iris Bar-Ziv, American actress, comedian, director, writer and producer
Iris Bannochie (1914–1988), Barbadian horticulturalist
Iris Yassmin Barrios Aguilar, Guatemalan judge
Iris Barry (1895–1969), American film critic
Iris Bell, American psychologist and alternative medicine researcher
Iris Berben (born 1950), German actress
Iris Birtwistle (1918–2006), English lyric poet and gallery owner
Iris Faircloth Blitch (1912–1993), United States Representative from Georgia
Iris Bohnet (born 1966), Swiss academic, Professor of Public Policy
Iris Burgoyne (1936–2014), South Australian author and Kokatha (Aboriginal) elder
Iris Burton (1930–2008), American talent agent and dancer
Iris Butler (1905–2002), English journalist and historian
Iris Cahn, Professor of the Film Conservatory at SUNY Purchase College
Iris Cantor (born 1931), American philanthropist in medicine and the arts
Iris Chacón (born 1950), Puerto Rican entertainer
Iris Chang (1968–2004), American historian
Iris Chung (born 1987), designer and model
Iris Clert (died 1986), owner of the Galerie Iris Clert
Iris Cummings (born 1920), American aviator and Olympic swimmer
Iris Davis (born 1950), American track and field sprinter
Iris DeBrito (born 1945), Brazilian footballer
Iris DeMent (born 1961), American singer
Iris Dexter (1907–1974), Australian journalist and war correspondent
Iris Estabrook (born 1950), Democratic former member of the New Hampshire Senate
Iris Evans (born 1941), Minister of the Legislative Assembly of Alberta
Iris Falcam (1938–2010), American-born librarian, researcher and First Lady of Micronesia
Iris Falcón (born 1973), Peruvian volleyball player
Iris Fontbona (born c.1943), Chilean businesswoman
Iris Fuentes-Pila (born 1980), Spanish middle-distance runner
Iris Gordy (born 1943), American songwriter, producer, and music executive
Iris Gower (born 1939), Welsh novelist
Iris Gusner (born 1941), German film director and screenwriter
Iris Habib Elmasry (1910–1994), Egyptian historian
Iris Hanika (born 1962), German writer and journalist
Iris Häussler (born 1962), German artist
Iris Hensley (1934–2003), Artistic Director of the Georgia Ballet
Iris Hoey (1885–1979), British actress
Iris Holland (1920–2001), American politician
Iris Jharap (born 1970), Dutch cricketer
Iris Johansen (born 1938), American author
Iris Kelso (1926–2003), American journalist
Iris Winnifred King (1910–2000), mayor of Kingston
Iris Klein, German beauty pageant contestant
Iris Komar, German swimmer
Iris Kramer (born 1981), German International motorcycle trials rider
Iris Krasnow (born 1954), American author, journalism professor, and speaker
Iris Kroes (born 1992), Dutch singer-songwriter and harpist
Iris Kyle (born 1974), American professional bodybuilder
Iris Le Feuvre (1928–2022) (née Renouf), Jersey politician
Iris Long (born 1934), AIDS activist
Iris Loveridge (1917–2000), English classical pianist
Iris Mack, American banker, professor and writer
 Iris Maity (born 1958), Indian model and actress
Iris Martinez (born 1956), Democratic member of the Illinois Senate
Iris Meléndez (died 2019), lawyer and prosecutor from Puerto Rico
Íris Mendes (born 1996), Portuguese acrobatic gymnast
Iris Vianey Mendoza (born 1981), Mexican politician and lawyer
Iris Meredith (1915–1980), American actress
Iris Mittenaere (born 1993), French model, Miss Universe and Miss France 2016
Iris Mor (1952–2017), Israeli newspaper editor, literary editor and writer
Iris Mora (born 1981), Mexican football forward
Iris Morhammer (born 1973), Austrian handballer
Iris Morley (1910–1953), English historian, writer and journalist
Iris Murdoch (1919–1999), British novelist
Iris Nampeyo (ca. 1856–1942), Hopi–Tewa potter in Arizona
Iris Nazmy (died 2018), Egyptian writer, journalist and film critic
Iris Origo (1902–1988), Marchesa of Val d'Orcia, a British-born biographer and writer
Iris M. Ovshinsky (1927–2006), American businesswoman
Iris Owens (1929–2008), pseudonym Harriet Daimler, American novelist 
Iris Parush, Israeli scholar of Hebrew literature
Iris Peterson (born 1922), American flight attendant
Iris Plotzitzka (born 1966), West German shot putter
Iris Rainer Dart (born 1944), American author and playwright
Iris Rauskala (born 1978), Austrian civil servant and politician
Iris Rideau (born c. 1937) is an American winemaker, businesswoman and activist
Iris Riedel-Kühn (born 1954), German tennis player
Iris Robinson (born 1949), Northern Irish politician
Iris Rogers, English badminton player
İris Rosenberger (born 1985), German-Turkish swimmer
Iris Miriam Ruíz (born 1951), Puerto Rican politician
Iris Runge (1888–1966), German applied mathematician and physicist
Iris Santos (born 1984), Dominican volleyball and beach volleyball player
Iris Sihvonen (1940–2010), Finnish speed skater
Iris Sing (born 1990), taekwondo athlete from Brazil
Iris Slappendel (born 1985), Dutch road racing cyclist
Iris Smith (wrestler) (born 1979), American freestyle wrestler
Iris Smyles, American writer
Iris Strubegger (born 1984), Austrian model
Iris Stuart (1903–1936), motion picture actress
Iris Szeghy (born 1956), Slovak composer
Iris Tanner (1906–1971), English swimmer
Iris Tjonk (born 2000), female Dutch swimmer
Iris Tree (1897–1968), English poet, actress and artists' model
Iris Vermillion (born 1960), German operatic mezzo-soprano
Iris Völkner (born 1960), German rower
Iris Wang (born 1994), American badminton player
Iris Wedgwood (1887–1982), British author, topographer and historian
Iris Weinshall (born 1953), commissioner of New York City Department of Transportation
Iris Williams (born 1944), Welsh singer
Iris Woolcock (died 1980), American artist, photographer, realtor and adventurer
Iris Yamashita (born 1966), American screenwriter
Iris Marion Young (1949–2006), American political scientist
Iris M. Zavala (1936–2020), Puerto Rican author, scholar, and poet
Iris Zimmermann (born 1981), American fencer
Iris Zscherpe (born 1967), German swimmer

Fictional
 Iris, a character in the video game Ace Attorney
 Iris, a hotel manager in American Horror Story: Hotel played by Kathy Bates
 Iris, a recurring character and Cyrus’ brief girlfriend before he realizes he is gay on Disney Channel series Andi Mack
 Iris, the main character of the series LoliRock
 Iris, a navigator and love interest to Zero, in the Mega Man X series
 Iris, a Pokémon Gym Leader in Pokémon White, Pokémon League Champion in Pokémon Black 2 and White 2 and the Pokémon series
 Iris, a cycloptic character from the animated series Ruby Gloom
 Iris the fairy, the fairy character in Tork
 Iris Blanc/Noire, a vampire featured in the video game Rune Factory Frontier
 Iris Clops, the daughter of the Cyclops from the Mattel franchise Monster High
 Iris Moss, Milton Moss's cheerful younger sister in Trolls: The Beat Goes On!
 Iris Simpkins, a British woman looking for a vacation who agrees to a house swap with a swanky LA producer in The Holiday, portrayed by Kate Winslet
 Iris "Easy" Steensma, a 13-year-old prostitute, featured in the film Taxi Driver, portrayed by Jodie Foster
 Iris Thompson, also known as SCP-105, a character in the SCP Foundation.
 Iris West, the love interest of Flash (Barry Allen) from DC Comics

Equivalents from other cultures
Foreign equivalents of Iris include: 
Eirys (Welsh) 
Elestren (Cornish)
Ayame (Japanese)

See also
Iris (disambiguation)
Iris (mythology)
List of most popular given names
Iiris (name)

References

Given names derived from plants or flowers
Given names of Greek language origin
Greek feminine given names
English feminine given names
Spanish feminine given names